Sudesh Mishra is a contemporary Fijian-Australian poet and academic.

Career
Sudesh Mishra was born in Fiji into an Indo-Fijian family. Coming to Australia to study he studied at The University of Wollongong and went on to complete a Ph.D. in English literature at Flinders University. He has published several volumes of poetry, the first of which, Rahu (means Rahu, the sun eclipse caused by the Asura in the Hindu mythology), received the Harri Jones Memorial Prize for Poetry in 1988. His writing commonly treats events in his home country, such as the 1987 coup, from an ironic perspective. 

In 2003 he received an Asialink Literature Residency at Jawaharlal Nehru University, New Delhi. He is currently Head of the School of Pacific Arts, Communication and Education (SPACE) at University of the South Pacific. He was an Associate Professor in Creative Writing at Deakin University in Australia and has taught literature at Stirling University in Scotland and University of the South Pacific, Suva campus.

Bibliography
Poetry
Rahu (1987)
Tandava (Meanjin, 1992) 
Memoirs of a Reluctant Traveller (Wakefield, 1994) 
Diaspora and the difficult art of dying (University of Otago, 2002) 

Criticism
Preparing faces : modernism and Indian poetry in English (CRNLE, 1995) 
Diaspora Criticism (Edinburgh: Edinburgh University Press, 2006)No Sign is an Island'' (2000)

External links
"A beautiful prospect from New Internationalist Magazine
2 poems from Sport Magazine
2 poems at NZEPC

Indo-Fijian writers
Australian poets
Fijian emigrants to Australia
Australian people of Indo-Fijian descent
Living people
Fijian Hindus
Australian Hindus
Flinders University alumni
Academic staff of the University of the South Pacific
Academics of the University of Stirling
Academic staff of Deakin University
Academic staff of Jawaharlal Nehru University
Year of birth missing (living people)